Liliʻuokalani (1838–1917), Queen of the Hawaiian Islands, was one of Hawaiʻi's most accomplished composers and musicians. She composed over 165 songs and chants. One of her most notable musical compositions is the popular song "Aloha ʻOe".

"Aloha ʻOe" 

(Farewell to Thee), Liliʻuokalani's most famous work about two lovers bidding farewell.

"He Mele Lāhui Hawaiʻi" 

(The Song of the Hawaiian Nation), was the third of Hawaiʻi's 4 national anthems. Liliʻuokalani wrote this song at the request of King Kamehameha V in 1866, well before she was Queen.

"Nohea I Muʻolaulani" 
Nohea I Muʻolaulani, translated as Handsome One of Muʻolaulani  sometimes as Handsome at Muʻolaulani, and also referred to simply as Muʻolaulani, dates to May 1885. It was composed for Liliʻuokalani's new home in Kapālama named Muʻolaulani which was opened with a gala party in May 1885. The Kapālama house was a source of great joy to her and became the subject of this song. It is now the site of the Liliʻuokalani Childrens' Center.

"Ahe Lau Makani" 
Ahe Lau Makani, translated as The Soft Gentle Breeze or There is a Zephyr, is a famous waltz composed by Queen Liliʻuokalani around 1868.  Probably written at Hamohamo, the Waikīkī home of the Queen, this song appeared in "He Buke Mele O Hawaii" under the title He ʻAla Nei E Māpu Mai Nei. Ahe Lau Makani is used only verse 1 and 2, and may be an abridged version. Līlīlehua refers to the name of the gentle rain in Palolo Valley, Oahu. Verse 1, 2 and the Chorus is translated by Liliʻuokalani, and Verse 3, 4 by Hui Hānai.

Ahe Lau Makani was composed jointly with the Queen's sister Princess Likelike and Kapoli, a mysterious collaborator who, to this day, remains unidentified.  The "Viennese-ness" of this waltz is especially evident in the hui, or chorus. Ahe Lau Makani describes a lover's sweet breath. It poetically describes someone's yearning for a loved one. As Dennis says, "In the figurative Hawaiian, this breeze is actually the breath of one who I admire, carried by the wind. Whoever the Queen wrote about, she got right into that person and conveyed it through the whole song."

"By And By, Hoʻi Mai ʻOe" 
By And By, Hoʻi Mai ʻOe, translated as By and By Thou Wilt Return, is a famous song composed by Queen Liliʻuokalani.

"Ka ʻŌiwi Nani" 

Ka ʻŌiwi Nani, translated as The Beautiful Native, is a love song composed and translated by Liliʻuokalani on June 23, 1886, at Palolo, Oʻahu.

In The Queen's Songbook, editors Dorothy Kahananui Gillett and Barbara Barnard Smith note that it's not a surprise that this love song from 1886, when Lili‘uokalani was still a princess, comes from a time when her diaries "are strewn with references to a special 'friend', perhaps Henry Berger." Berger was the director of the Royal Hawaiian Band, and Gillett and Smith note the possibility "that the song celebrates a romantic liaison" with him. Even the title, which translates to "The Beautiful Form", or as the Queen herself translated it, Beautiful One, has possible romantic associations. It is one of the most compelling melodies of the Queen's songs, and I arranged it so the second verse is played in a relaxed 12/8 ballad style.

"Ka Hanu O Hanakeoki" 
Ka Hanu O Hanakeoki, translated as The Scent of Hanakeoki, or sometimes plainly called Hanakeoki, is a famous song composed by Liliʻuokalani in 1874.  It a piece mentioned in "The Queen's Songbook" and translated into English by Hui Hānai.  The song may allude to property the Queen owned in Pālolo Valley.

"Kuʻu Pua I Paoakalani" 

Kuʻu Pua I Paoakalani, often referred to simply as Paoakalani, is a famous song composed by Queen Liliʻuokalani while imprisoned in  ʻIolani Palace. It is about her garden in Paoaokalani, from which a loyal haole supporter, John Wilson (whose mother, Evelyn T. Wilson, went into voluntary imprisonment with the Queen) regularly brought her flowers.  These flowers were wrapped in newspaper, through which means she was able to read the news that was prohibited to her during her imprisonment.  The song is a tribute to this young man, whom she held in very high esteem.

Performance of the song is known to be vocally challenging in terms of range, timing, power, and breath control.  One of the most famous recorded renditions was made by activist/singer George Helm on the first live album that was released after his death in the Kahoʻolawe struggle.

Manu Kapalulu 
Manu Kapalulu, translated to Quail, is one of the numerous songs and chants composed by Queen Liliʻuokalani.  Composed in November 1878, this was an admonishment from Liliʻuokalani to a disparaging remark.  According to Hawaiian traditions lessons in life and morality were usually taught in music and riddles.  Manu Kapalulu was about the Queen's annoyance with someone.

This song has many allusion to Hawaiian mythology.  The Kilohana in verse 1, stanza 2 is in Kalihi Valley on O'ahu and was the sacred home of Haumea and Wakea. Verse 2, stanzas 3 and 4 is an allusion to the old Hawaiian religion. Although Liliʻuokalani embraced Christianity, she was very familiar with the practice of worshipping and feeding na aumakua (family gods). Kapo, the dark sorceress in verse 3, stanza 4, is Kapoʻulaʻkīnaʻu, the dual-natured goddess, daughter of Haumea and Wakea, and sister of Pele and Kamohoaliʻi. Her benevolent nature was Laka, the goddess of hula.  This song also served as a mele inoa (name song) for Princess Kaʻiulani

Nani Nā Pua Koʻolau 

Nani Nā Pua Koʻolau, translated as The Flower of Koʻolau or Beautiful Are the Flowers of Koʻolau is a song composed by Queen Liliʻuokalani.  Written in 1860, this was one of Liliʻuokalani's first published works or probably the first; it was published in 1869 both in Hawaiian and English, one of her first works to appear in print. It was signed L.K. (Lydia Kamakaʻeha) Pākī, the name she used until her marriage in 1862 to John Owen Dominis. The English translation is by Liliʻuokalani herself.

This song demonstrates her poetic skills in which romantic love, love of nature and love of the land are happily entwined. This setting was written for the popular Pacific Rim Choral Festival which takes place in Hawaiʻi each summer.

"Ka Wiliwili Wai" 
Ka Wiliwili Wai, sometimes plainly called Wiliwiliwai, translated to The Lawn Sprinkler or The Twisting of the Water, is a famous song composed by Queen Liliʻuokalani who wrote the words and the music.  The story behind the song goes: As the Queen was sitting on her lanai at Washington Place, she saw something unusual next door in her neighbor, Dr. McKibben's yard, a lawn sprinkler going round and round. Fascinated, the Queen watched for a long time spinning this tune to its rhythm.

Lyrics

"Pauahi ʻO Kalani" 

Pauahi ʻO Kalani, translated as Pauahi, The Royal One, was composed by Liliʻuokalani in 1868.  It honors Princess Bernice Pauahi Bishop, the great-granddaughter of Kamehameha I and Liliʻuokalani's beloved foster sister.  It was written in 1868 prior to the accession of Liliʻuokalani's family. They were on a trip to the island of Hawaiʻi and had visited Puna and the Panaʻewa forest in the Hilo district. Liliʻuokalani wrote this song at Mānā. The Bishop Estate, Pauahi's continuing legacy, created and maintains the Kamehameha Schools. High school students at Kamehameha sing this song every year on Founder's Day, 19 December, the date of Pauahi's birth.  The song was translated by Mary Kawena Pukui.

Lyrics

"Pelekane" 
Liliʻuokalani composed Pelekane,  translated as England or Britain, in 1887 after she and Queen Kapiʻolani went to England for the Golden Jubilee of Queen Victoria. On this occasion, Queen Kapiʻolani wore a parure of catseye shells and a gown embroidered with blue peacock feathers. In the second verse, Liliʻuokalani describes the British Queen-Empress as the topmost blossom.

Lyrics

"Pelekane" by Elizabeth Kuahaia 
Another song of the same title, written by Elizabeth Kuahaia, is a song about the innocence lost in globalization/modernization. It was an event that helped create the concept of a "World War."

Pelekane means "Britain" and reveals the long-standing affinity that the Native Hawaiian people felt for England.  It was the British that the Hawaiian Kingdom attempted to emulate and identify with – so much so that the royal contingent traveled to England to attend Queen Victoria's Golden Jubilee in 1887 and adopted the "Union Jack" symbol in the Kingdom of Hawaiʻi flag.  This song may refer to England owning the Lusitania.

Unlike most other Native Hawaiian songs, it is written without the beautiful imagery of nature.  Instead, it describes the use of explosives and torpedoes.  This is warfare without warriors in hand-to-hand combat, with the concept of "civilians" redefined by wholesale destruction of places. In a way, this is a modern protest song is in the style of Kaulana Nā Pua.  This piece foreshadows the militarization of Hawaiʻi as the Western outpost for United States military forces.  This militarization of the islands is an important aspect of Native Hawaiian experience.  Not only are many areas reserved by the military, but the island economy is dependent upon it.

Lyrics

"Puna Paia ʻAʻala" 

Puna Paia ʻAʻala, translated to Puna's Fragrant Bowers, and other translation include Puna's Fragrant Glades and Puna's Sweet Walls. It is famous love song composed by Queen Liliʻuokalani in July 1868, who composed a total of 165 pieces in her life.  The setting is the Puna District on the Island of Hawaiʻi, which was renowned for its groves of fragrant hala (Pandanus tectorius).  The first two verses were published in He Buke Mele Hawaiʻi and the third verse is from a Bishop Museum manuscript. The fourth verse was preserved by Bill Kaiwa. Verse 1, 2, and hui translated by Liliʻuokalani. Verses 3 and 4 translated by Hui Hānai.

Along with Ahe Lau Makani and Paia Ka Nahele, composed in the same year, these two waltzes are especially evident in the hui, or chorus, of Puna Paia Aʻala. These three songs that took the form as waltzes, were a fresh departure for Liliʻuokalani. Their lyrics are full of romance, and the rhythmic buoyancy and grace of the music place them among her most memorable melodies.

Lyrics

"Sanoe" 

Sanoe, is a famous song composed by Queen Liliʻuokalani who wrote the words and the music.  "Sanoe" is the Hawaiian word meaning – the mist that drifts over our mountains – and alludes to the man drifting in like the mist to see his ipo (sweetheart). It is in the Queen's Song Book and also in He Mele Aloha. Liliʻuokalani composed this while still a princess in the court of her brother King David Kalākaua. The song describes a possibly clandestine love affair or romance in the royal court. This version is based on Robert Cazimero's choral arrangement for the Kamehameha Schools Song Contest. Steve composed the interlude between the second and third verses for this recording. Queen Liliʻuokalani originally wrote Sanoe in common time, though today it is almost always performed in triple meter. Where and how this change occurred is a mystery.

This affair in the royal court is centered on Sanoe, a love affair of two members of the royal family that were in love but promised marriage to other people, Princess Likelike and Colonel Curtis Piehu Iaukea. Kapeka was the joint composer to this song. Queen Lili‘uokalani indicates she composed Sanoe with "Kapeka", her friend whose real name was Elizabeth Sumner Achuck.

Sanoe was brought back into general circulation by ʻukulele master Eddie Kamae and Gabby with the Sons of Hawaiʻi on "MUSIC OF OLD HAWAIʻI".

Lyrics

"The Queen's Jubilee" 
The Queen's Jubilee is a famous song composed by Princess Liliʻuokalani of Hawaiʻi to commemorate the Golden Jubilee of Queen Victoria of the United Kingdom, which Princess Liliʻuokalani attended with a royal contingent from Hawaiʻi.

Lyrics

"The Queen's Prayer" 
The Queen's Prayer, or in Hawaiian Ke Aloha O Ka Haku.  It was published as Liliʻuokalani's Prayer, with the Hawaiian title and English translation ("The Lord's Mercy") now commonly called "The Queen's Prayer". It is a famous mele, composed by Queen Liliʻuokalani, March 22, 1895, while she was under house arrest at ʻIolani Palace. This hymn was dedicated to Victoria Kaʻiulani, her niece and heir apparent to the throne.

Queen Liliʻuokalani wrote this at the bottom of the manuscript: "Composed during my imprisonment at ʻIolani Palace by the Missionary party who overthrew my government."  She was referring to the illegal Overthrow of the Hawaiian monarchy by U.S. business interests backed by the U.S. government.

Lyrics

"Tūtū" 
Tūtū, translated as Granny, is a famous mele hula composed by Queen Liliʻuokalani. Mentioned in the song is Kaʻalaʻalaʻa, which refers to the area of lower Nuʻuanu below Maʻemaʻe Hill. This hula was composed for a benefit program at Kaumakapili Church in Palama. Maria Heleluhe danced the part of the tūtū (granny) and 7 little girls performed as the grandchildren.  The Queen taught the girls to sing the song with her and she accompanied them on her guitar. The song received 5 encores and the performers were showered with money.

Lyrics

Other compositions 

 "He Inoa Wehi No Kalanianaʻole" (A Name Adornment For Kalanianaʻole), honoring her young nephew Jonah Kuhio Kalanianaʻole
 "He ʻAla Nei E Mapu Mai Nei" (Soft, Constant Breeze)  
 "A Hilo Au"
 "He Pule"  (A Prayer), 1874 
 "Ka Wai Mapuna" (The Water Spring), 1876 
 "Onipaʻa" (Stand Firm), a simple piece written for a singing school 
 "Liko Pua Lehua" (Tender Leaves of the Lehua Flower) 
 "Ka Wai ʻOpuna Makani" (Wind of the Water-of-Cloud-Banks) to honor Lunalilo and obliquely to condemn Queen Emma's quest for the throne.
 "Ka Hae Kalaunu" (The Flag of the Crown), to glorify her families triumph in the election of 1874.
 "E Kala Kuʻu ʻUpu ʻAna" (Long Years Have I Yearned for Thee), written in 1873.
 "La ʻi Au E" (Peaceful Am I) 
 "Lei Ponimoʻi"  (Carnation Wreath or as more commonly referred to as Carnation Lei), composed November 1874.
 "Akahi Koʻu Manene" (I Have Just Shuddered), written at Wailuku
 "Pride of Waiehu", written at Lahaina  
 "Makani Waipio" (Lovely Waipio)  
 "He Inoa no Kaiʻulani" (A Name Song for Kaiʻulani); written for her niece.
 "He Kanikau No Lele-Io-Hoku"; a dirge for Leleiohoku, Queen Lili'uokalani's brother who died of rheumatic fever at age 22 in 1877.
 "Kokohi" (To Hold Forever) 
 "Puia Ka Nahele" (Forest Imbued with Fragrance), 1868.
 "Ehehene Ko ʻAka" (Giggle, Giggle Goes Your Laughter) 
 "He Aliʻi No Wau" (I Am Indeed, a Chief) 
 "Pipili Ka Ua I Ka Nahele" (The Rain Clings Close to the Forest) 
 "Ima Au Ia ʻOe E Ke Aloha" (I have Sought Thee, My Beloved) 
 "Paia Ka Nahele" (The Fragrant Woods)  
 "Thou E Ka Nani Mae ʻOle" (Thou Art the Never Fading Beauty) for which sixteen-year-old Miriam Likelike share credit.
 "Naʻu No ʻOe" (You are Mine), a charming waltz  
 "Lamalama i luna ka ʻonohi la" --- (Bright above is the rainbow ---)  
 "Lilikoʻi" composed on Maui as a mele inoa (name song) for her hānai daughter Lydia  
 "He ʻAi Na Ka Lani" (Foods For the Royalty), in honor of Kalakaua.
 "Anahulu", which took its name from a stream in Waialua, one of Liliʻu's favorite areas.
 "Ka lpo Nohea" (Gem of Beauty, often translated as : The Handsome Sweetheart).
 "A Chant" written for Bernice Pauahi Bishop's funeral, draws its text from the Book of Job and is the sole work dated 1884 
 "Ka Huna Kai" (The Sea Spray), written in London expressing a fond longing for Hawaiʻ'i.
 "Kiliʻoulani" (Fine Rain of the Heavenly Pinnacle) 
 "Leha Ku Koa Mau Maka" (Lift Up Your Eyes) based on Psalm 121,  dated June 1895.
 "E Kuʻu Hoʻola" (My Saviour), from Psalm 126, dated June 1895.
 "Himeni Hoʻole'a A Davida" (David's Hymn of Praise), also from Psalm 126, dated June 1895.
 "Ka Wai ʻApo Lani" (Heavenly Showers), a song expressing hope that she would be returned to the throne.
 "Ke Aloha ʻĀina" (Love for the Land), alternately called  He Lei Aloha (A Lei of Love). The song is a plea for the land and life of a nation and an exhortation to her people to stand resolute.
 "Ka Wai O Niakala", a mele hula kuʻi inspired by a trip to Niakala she had made from Boston.
 "Hoʻokahi Puana" (One Answer), in which she pronounced clearly, without the customary veiled language of Hawaiian chant, her views the new government of the Republic of Hawaiʻi.

External links 
 Youtube – ahe lau makani – ukulele classical
 Youtube – ahe lau makani 2 – ukulele classical take 2
  George Helm's Recording of Ku’u Pua I Paoakalani
 Emma Veary's version of Ku’u Pua I Paoakalani

See also 
 List of compositions by Likelike
 List of compositions by Leleiohoku II

References 

Compositions by Liliuokalani
Liliʻuokalani